Izolda Vasilyevna Izvitskaya (21 June 1932 – 1 March 1971) was a Soviet actress.

Isolda Izvitskaya was born in the small town of Dzerzhinsk, Russia. Her father was a chemist, her mother a teacher. Upon leaving high school she enrolled at VGIK (the All-Union State Institute of Cinematography). She was given small parts in several movies while still a student. In 1955 Izvitskaya was chosen for the lead in The Forty-First, a film based on a short story by Boris Lavrenyov. The film was very successful all over the country and in 1957 it was shown at the Cannes Film Festival where it was very well received. A new café in Paris was named after her.

At home Izvitskaya was made a member of the Association for Cultural Relations with Latin American countries; this gave her the opportunity to travel outside of the USSR.

Izvitskaya starred in several more movies; however, none of them achieved the success of The Forty-First. She made several more attempts to work in films but parts were getting smaller and scarcer, and she became depressed. In 1971 her husband, the actor Eduard Bredun, left her. She had a nervous breakdown and locked herself in her apartment in Moscow. She was found dead in her home, which was empty of any food. Her husband insisted that the obituary state "poisoning with an unknown substance" as the cause of death but according to the BBC Russian Service she died of cold and starvation.

Filmography

References
Biographical sketch
Another sketch

External links
 

1932 births
1971 deaths
Soviet film actresses
Russian film actresses
Gerasimov Institute of Cinematography alumni
Deaths by starvation
People from Dzerzhinsk, Russia
Deaths from hypothermia